The César Award for Best Editing is one of the annual César Awards given by the Académie des Arts et Techniques du Cinéma. Eligible films are usually in the French language.

Winners and nominees

1970s

1980s

1990s

2000s

2010s

2020s

See also
Academy Award for Best Editing
BAFTA Award for Best Editing
European Film Award for Best Editor
Magritte Award for Best Editing

References

External links 
  
 César Award for Best Editing at AlloCiné

Editing
Film editing awards